Shori Maneka is a small village of distract  Hafizabad. tehsil  Pindi Bhattian Distract Hafiz abad in Punjab, Pakistan. Its location is between Motorway M-2 and M-3. Almost people belong to tribe of Maneka bhatti. Contact novs

03007712243

03337712243

Hafizabad District
Villages in Hafizabad District